Paulo Ricardo de Souza Babilônia (born 23 May 2005), known as Paulinho, is a Brazilian footballer who plays as a right-back for Vasco da Gama.

Club career
Born in Tefé, Paulinho began his career with Vasco da Gama in 2014, at the age of eight, having successfully trialled with the club. He signed his first professional contract with the club in 2021, before going on to make his unofficial debut in a 3–0 friendly win against American side Inter Miami, as part of Vasco da Gama's 2023 pre-season.

Career statistics

Club

References

2005 births
Living people
Sportspeople from Amazonas (Brazilian state)
Brazilian footballers
Association football fullbacks
CR Vasco da Gama players